Eyal Levi (born May 22, 1979, Cleveland, Ohio). is an American guitarist, entrepreneur, record producer, podcaster and songwriter, best known as the CEO and co-founder of Unstoppable Recording Machine, an online school for rock and metal producers, and Riffhard, an online school for metal guitarists, as well as a founding member of metal band, Dååth. Levi has also been employed as a session guitarist, and touring member. His father is conductor Yoel Levi.

Albums produced
 Dååth – Futility (2004, self-released) – Production, Engineering, Songwriting, Guitar
 Misery Index – Dissent (2004, self-released) – Production, Engineering
 Arsis – A Diamond for Disease EP (2005, Willowtip Records) – Production, Engineering
 Misery Index – Discordia (2006, Relapse Records) – Production, Engineering
 Arsis – United in Regret (2006, Willowtip Records) – Production, Engineering
 Dååth – The Hinderers (2007, Roadrunner Records) – Production, Engineering, Songwriting, Guitar
 Dååth  – Dead on the Dancefloor digital EP (2007, Roadrunner Records) – Production, Engineering, Songwriting, Guitar
 Austrian Death Machine – Total Brutal (2008, Metal Blade Records) – Guest Guitar Solo
 Dååth – The Concealers (2009, Century Media Records) – Production, Engineering, Songwriting, Guitar
 Levi/Werstler – Avalanche of Worms (2010, Magna Carta Records)  – Production, Engineering, Composition, Guitar
 Dååth – Dååth (2010, Century Media Records) – Production, Engineering, Songwriting, Guitar
 Enders Game - What We've Lost (2010) - Engineering, Mixing, Guest Guitar Solo
 August Burns Red – Leveler (2011, Solid State Records) – Engineering, Mixing
 The Black Dahlia Murder – Ritual (2011, Metal Blade Records) – Engineering, Assistant Mixing
 Charred Walls Of The Damned – Cold Winds On Timeless Days (2011, Metal Blade Records) – Engineering
 Draekon – Prelude To Tragedy (2011, Self Release) – Production, Engineering, Mixing, Session Bass
 Carnifex – Until I Feel Nothing (2011, Victory Records) –  Mix Engineering
 Job for a Cowboy – Gloom EP (2011, Metal Blade Records) – Assistant Engineering
 Job for a Cowboy – Demonocracy (2012, Metal Blade Records) – Engineering
 Chelsea Grin - Evolve (2012, Artery Records) - engineering, Assistant Mixing
 Demon Hunter - True Defiance (2012, Solid State Records) - Mix Engineering
 Firewind - Few Vs Many (2012, Century Media Records) - Mixing
 Whitechapel - Whitechapel (2012, Metal Blade Records) - Engineering
 Six Feet Under - Undead (2012, Metal Blade Records) - Engineering
 The Contortionist - Intrinsic (2012, eOne Music) - Production, Engineering, Mixing
 Motionless in White - Infamous (2012, Fearless Records) - Mixing
 Battlecross - War of Will (2013, Metal Blade Records - Production)
 Dark Sermon - In Tongues (2013, eOne Music) -  Production, Engineering, Mixing
 Reflections - Exi(s)t (2013, eOne Music/Goodfight Records) - Production, Engineering, Mixing
 Conquering Dystopia - Conquering Dystopia (2014, self-released/Century Media Records) - Engineering
 Monuments - The Amanuensis (2014, Century Media Records) - Vocal Production
 Our Last Crusade – The Ideal & the Actual (2015, self-released) – Production, Engineering, Mixing
 Binary Code - Moonsblood (2016) - Production, Engineering, Mixing

References

External links
 Dååth on Encyclopaedia Metallum

American heavy metal guitarists
Jewish American musicians
1979 births
Living people
Musicians from Atlanta
Place of birth missing (living people)
Jewish heavy metal musicians
American people of Israeli descent
American people of Romanian-Jewish descent
Guitarists from Georgia (U.S. state)
American male guitarists
Dååth members
21st-century American guitarists
21st-century American male musicians
21st-century American Jews